The mixed double sculls rowing competition at the 2008 Summer Paralympics was held from 9 to 11 September at the Shunyi Olympic Rowing-Canoeing Park.
The event was competed by Category TA rowers, propelling boats by use of trunk & arms only. Each crew consisted of one man & one woman.

Winners of two heats qualified for the A Final. The remainder rowed in two repechage heats, with the first two in each qualifying for the A Final, the remainder rowing in the B Final.
 
The event was won by Zhou Yangjing and Shan Zilong, representing .

Results

Heats

Heat 1
Rowed 9 September at 16:20.

Heat 2
Rowed 9 September at 16:40.

Repechage

Heat 1
Rowed 10 September at 16:20.

Heat 2
Rowed 10 September at 16:40.

Final Round

Final B
Rowed 11 September at 15:40.

Final A
Rowed 11 September at 17:00.

References

Rowing at the 2008 Summer Paralympics